Olger Burton Burtness (March 14, 1884January 20, 1960) was a U.S. Representative from North Dakota and a North Dakota District Court Judge.

Background
Olger Burton Burtness was born on a farm near Mekinock in the Dakota Territory. He was the son of Ole O. and Mary (Anderson) Burtness, both immigrants from Norway. Burtness graduated from the academic department of the University of North Dakota at Grand Forks in 1906 and from its law department in 1907. He represented the University in several intercollegiate debates and was also active in The Mimer Society, a Scandinavian literary society. He was also a member of the university football team and was editor in chief of the Dacotah annual. Burtness was one of the founders of the UND Alumni Association, and helped organize the UND Development Fund.

Career
He was admitted to the bar the same year and commenced practice in Grand Forks. He served as prosecuting attorney of Grand Forks County 1911-1916. He served as delegate to the Republican National Conventions in 1916, 1936, and 1948. He served as member of the North Dakota State House of Representatives in 1919 and 1920. Burtness was elected as a Republican to the Sixty-seventh United States Congress and to the five succeeding Congresses (March 4, 1921 – March 3, 1933). He was an unsuccessful candidate for renomination in 1932.

In 1930 he was honored by the King of Denmark with an Order of the Falcon with a star. He also represented the President of the United States at the 100th anniversary of the Icelandic Parliament.

Later years
He resumed the practice of law and served as City attorney of Grand Forks, in 1936 and 1937. He was appointed judge of the First Judicial District, North Dakota District Court, by Governor Fred G. Aandahl in 1950 and served from November 1950 until his death. He died in Grand Forks on January 20, 1960. He was interred in Memorial Park Cemetery.

Personal life
He married Zoe Ensign on September 8, 1909, in Detroit Lakes, Minnesota. Following his death, Zoe Burtness donated funds to the University of North Dakota to construct an assembly hall for plays, lectures, and concerts, in honor of her husband. The Burtness Theater was dedicated on April 28, 1963.

Olger B. Burtness Papers
The Olger B. Burtness Papers consist primarily of personal diaries for 1921 and 1927, as well as personal financial records. Correspondence and material concerning the Dakota Playmakers, and the Sock and Buskin Society at the University of North Dakota.

References

1884 births
1960 deaths
American Lutherans
American people of Norwegian descent
Recipients of the Order of the Falcon
People from Grand Forks County, North Dakota
University of North Dakota alumni
North Dakota state court judges
Republican Party members of the North Dakota House of Representatives
Republican Party members of the United States House of Representatives from North Dakota
20th-century American politicians
20th-century American judges
20th-century Lutherans